The Maples may refer to:

Canada
 The Maples (electoral district), a riding in Winnipeg, Manitoba

United States
 The Maples, also known as the Benjamin Van Raalte House, listed on the National Register of Historic Places (NRHP) in Michigan
 The Maples (Smithsburg, Maryland), listed on the NRHP in Maryland
 The Maples (Cazenovia, New York), listed on the NRHP in Oneida County, New York
 The Maples (Rhinebeck, New York), listed on the NRHP in New York
 The Maples (Washington, D.C.), listed on the NRHP in Washington, D.C.